Floramar is a Belo Horizonte Metro station on Line 1. It was opened in July 2002 as the northern terminus of the two-station extension of the line from Primeiro de Maio to Floramar. On 20 September 2002, the line was extended to Vilarinho. The station is located between Floramar and Vilarinho.

References

Belo Horizonte Metro stations
2002 establishments in Brazil
Railway stations opened in 2002